Hesar (also Romanized as Ḩeşār; also known as Ḩeşār-e Ḩājjī Allā Verdī) is a village in Dughayi Rural District, in the Central District of Quchan County, Razavi Khorasan Province, Iran. At the 2006 census, its population was 169, in 47 families.

References 

Populated places in Quchan County